Steinfort is a commune and town in western Luxembourg. It is part of the canton of Capellen.

, the town of Steinfort, which lies in the north of the commune, has a population of 2,184.  Other towns within the commune include Hagen, Kleinbettingen and Grass.

Transport

Road
Steinfort lies at the Belgian/Luxembourg border on the Route d'Arlon (N6), the original road linking Luxembourg City to Arlon.

Rail
Steinfort was served by the Prince Henri Railway that ran from Pétange to Ettelbruck in the north of the country.  Despite the line's closure in 1967, the rails were never lifted and old rail infrastructure is still visible through Steinfort, where it crosses Route D'Arlon at a level crossing.

Nearest railway stations:
 Kleinbettingen railway station

Population

Notable Inhabitants
 Jean Asselborn (* 27. April 1949), Luxemburgish politician

References

External links
 

 
Communes in Capellen (canton)
Towns in Luxembourg